The 2017 Arizona Bowl was a college football bowl game played on December 29, 2017, at Arizona Stadium in Tucson, Arizona, United States.  The third edition of the Arizona Bowl featured the New Mexico State Aggies of the Sun Belt Conference against the Utah State Aggies of the Mountain West Conference.  Kickoff was scheduled for 3:30 PM MST and the game aired on CBS Sports Network.  It was one of the 2017–18 bowl games concluding the 2017 FBS football season.  Sponsored by the Nova Home Loans mortgage broker company, the game was officially known as the Nova Home Loans Arizona Bowl. The win for New Mexico State ended a 57-year drought for bowl wins.

Teams
The game featured the New Mexico State Aggies against the Utah State Aggies.  It was the 38th all-time meeting between the schools, with Utah State leading the series 30–7.  From 1984 until 2000, and again from 2003 until 2012, New Mexico State and Utah State were members of the same conference, spanning the Big West, Sun Belt and WAC until Utah State joined Mountain West in 2013.

New Mexico State Aggies

This was New Mexico State's fourth bowl game in school history and their first since the 1960 Sun Bowl, which coincidentally saw them play against Utah State; New Mexico State won that game by a score of 20–13. New Mexico State's appearance in this Arizona Bowl snapped their 56-year bowlless streak, which was the longest in all of FBS.

This bowl was also New Mexico State's final game as a member of the Sun Belt before going independent for 2018.

Utah State Aggies

This was Utah State's first Arizona Bowl.

Game summary

Scoring summary

Statistics

References

External links
Box score at ESPN
HIGHLIGHTS: New Mexico State Wins a Wild Arizona Bowl in Overtime | Stadium via YouTube

2017–18 NCAA football bowl games
2017
2017 Arizona Bowl
2017 Arizona Bowl
2017 in sports in Arizona
December 2017 sports events in the United States